The Angeles City Science High School (Mataas na Paaralang Pang-Agham ng Lungsod ng Angeles) is a Secondary Public Science High School system located on Doña Aurora St., Lourdes Sur East, Angeles City, Philippines. It was founded in 2006. It is a DepEd-recognized science high school. It is also a K-12 Curriculum based school as pursuant to DepEd order.

History 

Formerly known as the Angeles City National High School - Special Science Class, the school has been chosen as one of the 110 Science and Technology High Schools in the Philippines. The school currently has 16 classrooms, a computer laboratory, a covered court, a math laboratory, a research laboratory, a science laboratory and a library. With the new DepEd K-12 Curriculum, the school started to offer only Science, Technology, Engineering and Mathematics (STEM) Strand in 2016.

As of February 2019, the school has two school heads in-charge of Junior High School department and Senior High School department.

Achievements

The Special Science Class (SSC) was one of the schools to bag the UP-Pautakan Oblation Trophy after winning three years in a row. The Academic Team were winners in the Philips Mind Challenge of 2001 and the Sharp Minds Challenge in 2006. The school produces victors in DepEd sponsored competitions such as press conferences, science and math festivals, the Metrobank MTAP Challenge, and many others. It also stands out in invitational contests hosted by the schools in the city.

In 2005, the school ranked 7th, among the 500 schools in the Regional Schools Press Conference. It also ranked second in the English regional achievement test among the seventeen divisions comprising Region III.

In 2017 and 2018, the school started competing in International Research Competitions led by the school coach: Mrs. Lolita Bautista. The school won almost 7 awards as of June 1, 2018.

Transfer of campus

The SSC, which was turned-over by the DOST to DepEd in 1998 was allotted a portion of the lot where the Dr. Clemente N. Dayrit Sr. Elementary School stood. Today, the school address is at Dona Aurora St. Lourdes Sur East, Angeles City.  The campus has nine buildings and a covered court.

Science high schools in the Philippines
Schools in Angeles City
High schools in Pampanga
Educational institutions established in 1993
1993 establishments in the Philippines